Ariel Damian Grana (born 19 January 1976), commonly known as Ariel Grana, is an Argentinian footballer who last played for Porto Corallo. He made his Serie B debut with FBC Unione Venezia in the 2004-2005 season.

References

External links 
 

1976 births
Living people
Argentine footballers
Argentine expatriate footballers
Serie A players
Serie B players
Expatriate footballers in Italy
Argentine expatriate sportspeople in Italy
Association football defenders
Venezia F.C. players